Putnam is an unincorporated community and census-designated place (CDP) in Marengo County, Alabama, United States. As of the 2020 census, its population was 172.

Geography
The community is in the southwest corner of Marengo County, along Alabama State Route 69.

It is bordered to the north by Horse Creek and to the south by Big Bunny Creek, west-flowing tributaries of the Tombigbee River.

Demographics

As of the 2010 United States Census, there were 193 people living in the CDP. The racial makeup of the CDP was 72.5% Black, 23.3% White, 2.6% Native American and 1.6% from two or more races.

References

Census-designated places in Alabama
Census-designated places in Marengo County, Alabama
Unincorporated communities in Alabama
Unincorporated communities in Marengo County, Alabama